The Symphony of Northwest Arkansas (SoNA) is a professional orchestra in the Northwest region of Arkansas, founded with support from corporate, foundation and private donors. SoNA performs as a resident company of Walton Arts Center in Fayetteville, Arkansas and frequently collaborates with area ensembles and institutions, including the University of Arkansas, John Brown University and Crystal Bridges Museum of Art.



History 
SoNA is an independent 501(c) 3 organization, and is the new name for the former North Arkansas Symphony (NASO), which was founded in 1954.  After a 3-year hiatus and restructure of the organization in 2008, SoNA returned to the stage in the spring of 2011.  SoNA has an active Board of Directors and Advisors composed of community leaders from throughout Northwest Arkansas.

In the fall of 2013, SoNA launched an arts integration educational program, ImagiMusic, which has enabled SoNA to reach over 3,000 students from ten regional Tier 1 schools.

Conductors 

1981 - 1997 - Carlton Woods

1999 - 2008 - Jeannine Wagar

2010–Present - Paul Haas

References

External links 
SoNA Official Page
Symphony of Northwest Arkansas - Facebook

American orchestras
Musical groups established in 1954
Performing arts in Arkansas
Musical groups from Arkansas